Ramingining Airport  is an airport located  southwest of Ramingining, Northern Territory, Australia. The airport received $32,965 in funds for security upgrades in 2005.

Airlines and destinations

See also
 List of airports in the Northern Territory

References

External links
Picture of Ramingining Airport

Airports in the Northern Territory